Paradise Found is a musical based on the Joseph Roth novel Die Geschichte von der 1002. Nacht (The Tale of the 1002nd Night). The musical's book is by Richard Nelson, with lyrics by Ellen Fitzhugh set to the music of Johann Strauss II. It premiered in 2010 at London's Menier Chocolate Factory in a production co-directed by Hal Prince and Susan Stroman.

Production history
In an interview, Hal Prince said that the musical would "center on a Middle Eastern ruler who travels to Vienna in search of romantic 'inspiration,' and the machinations that occur when he demands a rendezvous with a noblewoman who turns out to be the empress of Austria." It had been planned to bring the musical to Broadway after its premiere in London. Early readings featured John Cullum, Mandy Patinkin, Shuler Hensley, Judy Kaye, Emily Skinner, Rebecca Luker and Kate Baldwin.

Paradise Found opened in London on May 26, 2010, after previews starting on May 19, at the Menier Chocolate Factory and closed on June 26. The musical was directed by Prince and Susan Stroman (who also choreographed), with scenic design by Beowulf Boritt, costume design by Judith Dolan and arrangements and orchestrations by Jonathan Tunick.  The cast featured John McMartin as the Shah of Persia, Mandy Patinkin as a  Eunuch, Shuler Hensley as the Baron, Judy Kaye as Frau Matzner and Kate Baldwin as Mizzi.

Songs
Source: CurtainUp

Act 1
Overture 
Once and Now - Shah, Eunuch, Grand Vizier 
Train Station - Company 
Perfect Love - Eunuch, Girls 
Feeling Good - Mizzi, the Baron 
Ev'ry Little Bit - Soap Manufacturer's Wife, Eunuch, Customers 
The Bat - Instrumental 
Faces Like Flow'rs - Eunuch, Women, Men 
Fanfare/Marziale Instrumental 
Empress of Fantasy -The Baron, Eunuch 
Without Desire - Eunuch, the Baron, Frau Matzner, Shah

Act 2
Never Better - Mizzi, the Baron, Eunuch, Frau Matzner 
Save This Empire - General, Gossips, Women, the Emperor, Chorus 
Feeling Good (Reprise) - Mizzi, the Baron 
The Same Lovely Vienna - Customers 
How Could You Know - Frau Matzner, Customers 
What Are They? - Baron Mizzi 
Ve Made  Em-per-ess - Baron Trummer 
Perfect Love (Reprise) - Eunuch, Wives
Finale
Without Desire - Eunuch, the Baron, Frau Matzner, Mizzi, Chorus 
Feeling Good - Baron, Mizzi, Harem Women, Women, Men 
Save This Empire - Company

Critical response
As reported by The New York Times, critics "cited flaws in pretty much every aspect of the musical." The British Theatre Guide reviewer noted that "'Paradise Found' is a serviceable light comedy musical but with the talents available, many visitors might have hoped for an evening a little closer to Paradise."

Cast 
2010 Menier Chocolate Factory Premiere
 Shah of Persia: John McMartin
 Eunuch: Mandy Patinkin
 Baron: Shuler Hensley
 Frau Matzner: Judy Kaye
 Mizzi: Kate Baldwin
 Grand Vizier: George Lee Andrews
 Soap Manufacturer's Wife: Nancy Opel
 with Amanda Kloots-Larsen, Lacey Kohl, Herndon Lackey, Daniel Marcus, Jim Poulos, Martin Van Treuren, and Pamela Winslow Kashani

References

External links
Listing, theatermania.com

2010 musicals
Musicals based on novels